This article lists important figures and events in Malaysian public affairs during the year 1987, together with births and deaths of notable Malaysians.

Incumbent political figures

Federal level
 Yang di-Pertuan Agong: Sultan Iskandar
 Raja Permaisuri Agong: Sultanah Zanariah
 Prime Minister: Dato' Sri Dr Mahathir Mohamad
 Deputy Prime Minister: Dato' Ghafar Baba
Lord President: Mohamed Salleh Abas

State level
  Sultan of Johor: Tunku Ibrahim Ismail (Regent)
  Sultan of Kedah: Sultan Abdul Halim Muadzam Shah
  Sultan of Kelantan: Sultan Ismail Petra
  Raja of Perlis: Tuanku Syed Putra
  Sultan of Perak: Sultan Azlan Shah (Deputy Yang di-Pertuan Agong)
  Sultan of Pahang: Sultan Ahmad Shah
  Sultan of Selangor: Sultan Salahuddin Abdul Aziz Shah
  Sultan of Terengganu: Sultan Mahmud Al-Muktafi Billah Shah
  Yang di-Pertuan Besar of Negeri Sembilan: Tuanku Jaafar
  Yang di-Pertua Negeri (Governor) of Penang: Tun Dr Awang Hassan
  Yang di-Pertua Negeri (Governor) of Malacca: Tun Syed Ahmad Al-Haj bin Syed Mahmud Shahabuddin
  Yang di-Pertua Negeri (Governor) of Sarawak: Tun Ahmad Zaidi Adruce Mohammed Noor
  Yang di-Pertua Negeri (Governor) of Sabah:
 Tun Mohd Adnan Robert (Until November)
 Tun Said Keruak (From November)

Events
 1 January – Jabatan Telekom (Telecommunication Department) was incorporated as Syarikat Telekom Malaysia Berhad (STM).
 February – The Carcosa was returned to the Government of Malaysia and renamed "Carcosa Seri Negara".
 9 March – During the Ming Court political crisis of Sarawak, 27 out of the 48 state assemblymen suddenly announced their support for Abdul Rahman Ya'kub while calling Abdul Taib Mahmud to resign as chief minister.
 April – The Malaysian constitutional crisis occurred.
 16 April – Abdul Taib Mahmud won the Sarawak state election after the Ming Court crisis.
 June – Menara Maybank or Maybank Tower became the tallest building in Kuala Lumpur.
 July – Opening of the Petronas petroleum and gas refinery in Kerteh, Terengganu.
 September – 1987 World Silat Championships.
 1 October – The closed-toll system came into force along the Kuala Lumpur–Ayer Keroh and Ipoh–Changkat Jering expressways.
 15 October – Malaysian Airline System (MAS) changed its corporate identity and became known as Malaysia Airlines.
 27 October – Operation Lalang. More than 100 opposition activists were arrested, including Lim Kit Siang, under the Internal Security Act (ISA).
 28 October – The hatchback version of the Proton Saga "Aeroback" was launched.

Births
 20 May – Syazwan Zulkifly – Actor
 18 September – Tan Boon Heong – Badminton player

Deaths
14 December – Roseyatimah – Malay film actress

See also
 1987
 1986 in Malaysia | 1988 in Malaysia
 History of Malaysia

 
Years of the 20th century in Malaysia
Malaysia
Malaysia
1980s in Malaysia